The Ausetani were an ancient Iberian (pre-Roman) people of the Iberian peninsula (the Roman Hispania). They are believed to have spoken the Iberian language. They lived in the eponymous region of Ausona and gave their name to the Roman city of Ausa. 

The Ausetani minted their own coins which bore the inscription ausesken in northeastern Iberian script that is interpreted in Iberian language as a self-reference to the ethnic name of that people: from the Ausetani or from those of Ausa.

See also
Iberians
Pre-Roman peoples of the Iberian Peninsula

External links

Detailed map of the Pre-Roman Peoples of Iberia (around 200 BC)

Pre-Roman peoples of the Iberian Peninsula
History of Catalonia